Persons with the surname More, Moré or Mores include:

 Antonis Mor (16th century), Dutch painter
 Anthony More (musician) (born 1948), British musician
 Edward Rowe Mores (1731–1778), the first person to use the title actuary in relation to insurance mathematicians
 Ellen More (active 1504-1527), servant at the Scottish royal court
 George More (recusant) (born 1542) English supporter of Mary, Queen of Scots
 George More (1553–1662), English politician
 George More (footballer), Scottish footballer
 Hamish More (born 1940), Scottish cricketer
 Hannah More (1745–1833), English writer and philanthropist
 Henry More (1614–1687), English philosopher of the Cambridge Platonist school
 Karren More, American materials scientist
 Katherine More (1586–?), mother of Mayflower child Richard More
 Kenneth More (1914–1982), British actor
 Richard More (1879–1936), English cricketer and colonial administrator
 The More children: Ellen, Jasper, Mary and their brother, 
 Richard More (Mayflower passenger) (1614-c1694/96)
 Samuel More (1593–1662), involved in two separate controversies in England
 Thomas More (1478–1535), English lawyer, author, statesman, and Catholic martyr
 Benny Moré (1919–1963), famous Cuban singer
 Marquis de Mores (1858–1896), frontier ranchman in the Badlands of Dakota Territory during the final years of the American Old West era
 Theocharis Mores (1927–1992), Greek painter

See also
 More (disambiguation)
 Mohr (disambiguation)
 Moor (disambiguation)
 Moore (disambiguation) or Moore (surname)
 Mór (disambiguation)
 Morè (clan)